R. Ted Bottiger (November 8, 1932 – January 23, 2014) was an American lawyer and politician.

Born in Tacoma, Washington, Bottinger received his bachelor's degree from the University of Puget Sound and his law degree from the University of Washington School of Law. He practiced law in Puyallup, Washington. Bottiger then served in the Washington House of Representatives as a Democrat from 1965 to 1972. Bottinger then went on to serve in the Washington State Senate from 1973 to 1986. From 1987 until 1995, he was a member of the Northwest Power and Conservation Council, representing the state of Washington.

Notes

1932 births
2014 deaths
Politicians from Puyallup, Washington
University of Puget Sound alumni
University of Washington School of Law alumni
Washington (state) lawyers
Democratic Party Washington (state) state senators
Democratic Party members of the Washington House of Representatives
Politicians from Tacoma, Washington
20th-century American lawyers